Tim Gaines (born Timothy Hagelganz; December 15, 1962) is an American bass guitarist best-known as the long-time bassist for the Christian metal band Stryper until his departure in 2017.

Biography

Early life 
Gaines was born in Portland, Oregon, into a German family, whose ancestry was that of the Volga Germans. When Gaines was four years old, he and his family moved to Arcadia, California, where he later attended Arcadia High School. When he was young, he was bullied by classmates at school because of his unique and often mispronounced last name, Hagelganz, and for being the son of Arcadia Presbyterian Church's pastor. He later adopted the stage name Gaines in the likeness of his uncles Reuben, a radio announcer, and Ronnie, a jazz nightclub performer, who also used the name professionally.

Musical career

With Stormer 
After Arcadia High School, Gaines joined the band Stormer, with whom he recorded a demo and had performed extensively in Los Angeles and on Hollywood's Sunset Strip.

At the time Gaines joined Stormer, they had already been a popular band for 10 years in the Los Angeles area. The lineup at the time consisted of Tom Hardy on vocals; Steve Hall on drums; Stephan Shawn on guitar, keys, and vocals; and Donny Simmons on lead guitar and vocals.

In an interview about Stormer, Gaines recalled, "We signed a deal with an indie label called Rockwoodz music out of Phoenix, Arizona, and they put us in the studio to record an album and a Christmas single. Well, the single was the only thing that ever made it to vinyl and 500 singles were sent out all over the U.S. to radio. We got some good reviews for the single in some trade magazines but nothing ever happened with the band. For whatever reason, Rockwoodz went belly up and the album was never released. We did some small tours around the southwest but eventually I was to leave the group."

In 2008, when asked if the demos will be remastered and made public, Gaines replied, "I doubt if anyone can find the Masters. We are talking of having a Stormer reunion in the near future. We may decide to record it." Gaines occasionally collaborated with Donny Simmons and Tom Hardy when he was not working with Stryper.

With Stryper
Being a Sunset Strip regular, in 1983, Gaines joined up with Michael Sweet, Robert Sweet, and Oz Fox, all of whom had already formed Roxx Regime, which they would later change to Stryper. Gaines quickly rounded out the quartet's sound with his bass, background vocal, and keyboard skills. Gaines recorded the band's debut EP The Yellow and Black Attack and their follow-up full-length album, Soldiers Under Command, in 1985.

Gaines briefly left the band during the pre-production period of the band's Platinum-selling album To Hell with the Devil but rejoined the band after the sessions were concluded to tour. Gaines did not play on the band's follow up, In God We Trust, but toured in support of the album.

Gaines's contributions to the band's next release, Against the Law, were evident in his playing throughout the album, but he did not play on the band's cover of Earth, Wind & Fire's "Shining Star," which featured bassist Randy Jackson.

With Stryper, Gaines has contributed to 17 albums, including live performances and studio albums. Soldiers Under Command was certified Gold and To Hell with the Devil was certified Platinum.

Post-Stryper 

After Stryper, Gaines played in Rex Carroll's project King James along with Stryper alum Robert Sweet. He also recorded with Tourniquet on Crawl to China. Afterward, he formed SinDizzy with Stryper guitarist Oz Fox and released one album, He's Not Dead.

Stryper reunion

Gaines's involvement with Fox in SinDizzy led to a partial Stryper reunion in 1999 at a concert in Puerto Rico, to which both SinDizzy and former Stryper frontman Michael Sweet were invited. Later, all former bandmates played a show in Costa Rica, leading to a full-blown reunion in 2000. These appearances led to a 2003 reunion tour and a new compilation release, 7. Gaines spent April and May 2007 supporting Richard Marx on bass, touring the U.S., the Dominican Republic, and Trinidad. Gaines joined Tourniquet on stage at Flevo Festival in 2008.

In fall 2009, Gaines released his first solo effort titled Breakfast @ Timothy's.

On September 6, 2011, Gaines began endorsing Overture Guitars with a signature model, the Overture Stronghold TG Bass.

In September 2016, Stryper frontman Michael Sweet announced that the band would be going on hiatus due to personal issues affecting bassist Timothy Gaines. The hiatus would begin once the band had completed the To Hell With the Devil 30th Anniversary Tour. Sweet stated that they did not plan to continue as a band without Gaines after that time. During the hiatus the band members stated that they would pray about the direction of the band going forward. Later Sweet stated that Gaines was moving on from the personal issues and would take time to decide what he wanted to do in regards to the band. While Sweet disliked the idea of continuing without Gaines, he stated that he was open to filling the position of bassist with the right person if necessary. Gaines then confirmed that he was no longer a member of the band.

Following the hiatus, the band issued a statement advising that Gaines had been fired from the band and removing him from the roster on the band's website. Gaines claimed that he was kicked out after he was given an ultimatum by the band.

Discography

Stryper
 The Yellow and Black Attack (1984)
 Soldiers Under Command (1985)
 Against the Law (1990)
 Can't Stop the Rock (1991)
 7: The Best of Stryper (2003)
 The Covering (2011)
 Second Coming (2013)
 No More Hell to Pay (2013)
 Live at the Whisky (2014)
 Fallen (2015)

Solo
 Breakfast At Timothy's (2009)

Guest appearances
 Crawl to China, Tourniquet (bass on "Claustrospelunker") (1997)
 Music City Live, Bryan Duncan & The NehoSoul Band (bass on "Blue Skies") (2004)
 Rock Of Ages - Where Classic Hymns Meets Classic Rock, Dez Dickerson (bass on "Amazing Grace" and "Fairest Lord Jesus") (2005)
 Soundtrack Of A Soul, Liberty N' Justice (2006)
 I'm Not Your Suicide, Michael Sweet (bass on "How To Live") (2014)
 Homo Homini Lupus, Pÿlon (bass on "South of Heaven") (2014)

Other works
 King James, King James (1994)
 SinDizzy, SinDizzy (1998)
 Faithsedge, Faithsedge (2019)

References

1962 births
American Christians
Living people
American heavy metal bass guitarists
American male bass guitarists
American heavy metal singers
American performers of Christian music
Place of birth missing (living people)
Musicians from Portland, Oregon
People from the San Gabriel Valley
American people of German-Russian descent
Stryper members
20th-century American bass guitarists
20th-century American male musicians